William Hiester Jr. (October 10, 1790 – October 13, 1853) was an American politician from Pennsylvania who served as an Anti-Masonic member of the United States House of Representatives for Pennsylvania's 4th congressional district from 1831 to 1837. 

A member of the Hiester Family political dynasty, he was the father of U.S. Congressman Isaac Ellmaker Hiester and the uncle of Pennsylvania State Senator and U.S. Congressman Hiester Clymer.

Biography
A son of William Hiester, Sr. and Anna Maria (Myer) Hiester, William Hiester Jr. was born in Berne, Pennsylvania on October 10, 1790. After attending the local, public schools, he became a farmer and merchant in Lancaster County. 

On February 8, 1824, he wed Lucy Ellmaker (1797-1854). A member of the prominent Ellmaker family, she was the only child of Isaac Ellmaker (1762-1830) and Christiana Ellmaker (1764-1802). William and Lucy Hiester's son, Isaac Ellmaker Hiester, who was born in New Holland, Lancaster, Pennsylvania on May 29, 1824, would go on to become a member of the U.S. House of Representatives.

Military service
William Hiester Jr. served as second lieutenant with Captain Jacob Marshall's infantry company of the Pennsylvania Militia's First Regiment, Second Brigade during the War of 1812. His unit left Reading, Pennsylvania on September 2, 1814, and was assigned to duties in York, Pennsylvania until March 4, 1815, according to Pennsylvania historian Morton L. Montgomery.

Political career
During the early and mid-1820s, Hiester practiced law in Lancaster County. His duties including assisting clients with the resolution of family estate matters. He was also active in local politics and government, serving as Lancaster County Justice of the Peace from 1823 to 1828 and as Secretary of the State Caucus for the Anti-Masonic Convention in 1828. 

Although Hiester ran unsuccessfully for the United States House of Representatives in 1819 and 1828, he was a successful Anti-Masonic Party candidate for Congress in 1830, serving three terms from March 4, 1831 to March 4, 1837. During his tenure, he advocated for various economic reform measures, including tariffs and the "re-establishment of a sound National Currency."

Hiester was then appointed as a delegate to the Pennsylvania Constitutional Convention, 1837-1838, remained active with Democratic Anti-Masonic politics, subsequently served in the Pennsylvania State Senate for the 6th district from 1840 to 1842, and was elected Speaker of the Pennsylvania Senate in 1842.

Later years
During the final phase of his life, Hiester devoted his time to farming. He also remained active in local politics and in charitable and civic affairs.

Illness, death and burial
Sometime during the final decade of his life, Hiester fell ill with a disease which caused paralysis. After several years of worsening health, he died from Apoplexy at his home in New Holland, Pennsylvania on October 13, 1853. He was interred at the Lancaster Cemetery in Lancaster, Pennsylvania.

In 1854, a large, four-piece monument was erected above the graves of William Hiester and his wife, Lucy. In addition to a roughly eleven-foot-tall obelisk adorned with a wreath of lillies and roses and marked with the Hiester surname in raised letters, a die "beautifully worked, the top ... finished with scrolls and carving, and on each of the four narrow sides ... a scroll Console highly ornamented," and a roughly four-foot-tall plinth supporting the console, with a roughly five-by-twelve-inch base. Crafted from Italian marble, it reportedly weighed 18,000 pounds.

References

External links

|-

1790 births
1853 deaths
People from Berks County, Pennsylvania
Hiester family
Pennsylvania Dutch people
Anti-Masonic Party members of the United States House of Representatives from Pennsylvania
Pennsylvania state senators
People from Lancaster County, Pennsylvania
American militia officers
Military personnel from Pennsylvania
American militiamen in the War of 1812
Burials in Pennsylvania